Attilio Terragni was a member of the rightist Monarchist National Party, and was the sole Italian Senator from Lombardy belonging to this party. He died in office in 1958. He was an architect by training and brother of Giuseppe Terragni.

Political career

Role in the Senate

Committee assignments

Electoral history

See also
Italian Senate election in Lombardy, 1953

Footnotes

External links

Site

1896 births
1958 deaths
Members of the Italian Senate from Lombardy
Monarchist National Party politicians
20th-century Italian politicians
Members of the Senate of the Republic (Italy)